George Frederick "Chip" Johannessen (born November 16, 1955) is an American writer, editor, and producer of several popular television series. He is credited with work on 24, Homeland, Dexter, Moonlight, Millennium, and Beverly Hills, 90210, among others.

Early life and education
Johannessen graduated with honors from Harvard University, where he wrote pieces for The Harvard Lampoon. Subsequently he earned a J.D. at the UCLA School of Law.

Career
Johannessen began his television writing career with an episode of the sitcom Married... with Children in 1991. He then took a story editor position on the third season of Beverly Hills, 90210 in 1992. He was promoted to executive story editor for the fourth season in 1993. He joined the production staff as a co-producer for the fifth season in 1994. He went on to work as a producer on The Monroes in 1994.

He joined the crew of Chris Carter's series Millennium as a writer and co-producer and writer for the first season in 1996. He was promoted to producer midseason. He returned as a consulting producer for the second season in 1997. He became an executive producer for the third season in 1998. He wrote an episode of another Carter series in 2000; The X-Files.

He joined the crew of Dark Angel as a consulting producer for the first season in 2000 and continued this role for the second season in 2001. In late 2001 he wrote an episode for the first season of the action drama series 24.

In 2005 he joined the crew of freshman science fiction series Surface as a consulting producer and writer. The series was canceled after one season.

In 2007 he joined the crew of Moonlight as an executive producer and writer. The series focused on a vampire investigator. Johannessen served as show runner for the first twelve episodes but left the crew after this. The series was also canceled after its first season.

In 2009 he returned to 24 as a consulting producer and writer for the end of the seventh season. He became a co-executive producer for the eighth season in fall 2009 and was promoted to executive producer for the series final episodes in 2010.

Johannessen replaced Clyde Phillips as executive producer and show runner for the fifth season of the Showtime drama series Dexter. He was joined on the series by 24 collaborator Manny Coto. Johannessen left the crew after the fifth season and was replaced as show runner by executive producer Scott Buck. Johannessen remained with Showtime as a producer for the new original drama series Homeland which was developed by his The X-Files and 24 colleagues Alex Gansa and Howard Gordon.

In 2019, Johannessen joined other WGA members in firing his agents as part of the Guild's stand against the ATA after the two sides were unable to come to an agreement on a new "Code of Conduct" that addressed the practice of packaging.

Filmography

Films

Television

References

External links

1955 births
Writers from Detroit
American television producers
American television writers
American male television writers
The Harvard Lampoon alumni
Living people
UCLA School of Law alumni